Sandra Tannian is a camogie player, a member of the Galway senior panel that unsuccessfully contested the All Ireland finals of 2010 and 2011 against Wexford, She was an All-Star nominee in 2010.

Other awards
Senior Gael Linn Cup 2008, Senior Gael Linn Cup 2000, Senior National League 2000, Junior All Ireland 1998, All Ireland Minor 1994, 1996, eight All Ireland Vocational Schools medals, one Purcell Cup, one National Camogie League, one club Intermediate, three North American titles with Éire Óg Boston.

References

External links
 Camogie.ie Official Camogie Association Website

1980 births
Living people
Galway camogie players